Hong Ling (born Somaline Ang Ling; ; 16 August 1994) is a Singaporean actress.

Early life and education
Born to a Thai mother and a Singaporean Chinese father,  Hong graduated from Fuchun Secondary School. She has two siblings, one of whom is a younger brother. She was scouted while studying at Temasek Polytechnic, though she disrupted her studies due to career interest as an actress.

Career 

Hong was discovered through talent search programme Hey Gorgeous, in which she emerged as one of the semi-finalists in 2013. During the talent search programme, she was introduced as Somaline Ang, her Thai name. After her participation in the show, she switched to using her Chinese name, Hong Ling as she found that people found it difficult to pronounce her Thai name. Subsequently, she completed an acting course at the Singapore Media Academy in 2014.

In 2014, Hong was involved in a long-form drama titled 118 where she paired up with Nick Teo.

In 2015, she was involved in a drama titled You Can Be an Angel Too and won her first award, Tokyo Bust Express Sexy Babe Award, at Star Awards 2015.

In 2016, she made cameo appearances in Soul Reaper and Hero. She also had filmed other television series such as I Want to Be a Star, The Dream Job and The Truth Seekers.

In 2017, she gained her first female lead in Home Truly and also continued with the sequel in 118 II. She gained her first nomination as one of the Top 10 Most Popular Female Artistes.

In 2018, she is  involved in dramas such as 118 Reunion, Fifty & Fabulous, 29th February, a toggle original series, Love At Cavenagh Bridge and also long running drama series, Jalan Jalan.

In Star Awards 2021, she obtained her first Top 10 Most Popular Female Artistes award.

Filmography

TV series

Compilation album

Awards and nomination

References

External links 

 Hong Ling profile on The Celebrity Agency

1994 births
Living people
Singaporean people of Thai descent
Singaporean television actresses